Anna Thammudu is a 1958 Telugu-language drama film, produced by Kadaru Venkateswara Rao under the Sri Raja Rajeswari Film Company banner and directed by C. S. Rao. It stars N. T. Rama Rao, Sowcar Janaki and Jaggayya, with music composed by Ashwatthama.

Plot
Madhava Rao (A. V. Subba Rao) & Nageswara Rao (Mukkamala) are a sibling. Madhav Rao leads a happy family life with his wife Shantamma (Malathi) and son Ravi (Master Balu) whereas Nageswara Rao is a spoilt brat that's why his brother has ostracized from the family. But when Madhava Rao is on his deathbed he returns, cleverly slaughters his brother, and grabs their property by cheating his sister-in-law. After that, he plans to eliminate Ravi too, listening to it, Shantamma runs out and falls asleep after reaching the outskirts. At that time, a thief notices jewelry on Ravi for which he kidnaps and throws him on the road. A couple passing on notices the kid and rears him. After waking up Shantamma goes into shock due to misplacing of Ravi, a church father Joseph (K.V.S.Sarma) guards her and she realizes she is pregnant. Ranganna (Koteswara Rao) a loyal servant of Shantamma is in search of her, surprisingly, he finds Ravi at his sister's house. On the other side, Shantamma gives birth to a baby boy Rajendra (Master Seshagiri), and works as a gardener in the church. Once Brahmanandam spots Shantamma orders his henchmen to get her, they trap and take her to a secluded place. Fortunately, the police arrive, to abscond they throw a dead body and indict Shantamma for which she has been sentenced. Father Joseph joins Rajendra in an orphanage in Madras for higher studies. Years roll by, and Ravi (N. T. Rama Rao) is raised by Ranganna along with his niece Padma (Girija) and Rajendra (Jaggayya) becomes a solicitor. Nageswara Rao also settles in Madras with his girlfriend Vajram (Rajasulochana) and assistant Brahmanandam (Chadalavada). After release, Shantamma also reaches the same town and faints on the road, spotting her Rajendra gives her shelter and treats her as his mother. Rajendra loves Rani (Sowcar Janaki), the daughter of Purushottama Rao (Mikkilineni) who works as a clerk at Nageswara Rao. Nageswara Rao is erotic towards Rani, but Purushottama Rao performs Rani's marriage with Rajendra by confronting Nageswara Rao for which Nageswara Rao is begrudged. Meanwhile, Brahmanandam traps Padma and takes her to Vajra Vilas where Nageswara Rao tries to molest her to escape she commits suicide, before dying, she reveals the truth to Ravi. Furious Ravi reaches Vajra Vilas, at the same time, Vajram also quarrels with Nageswara Rao about his misdeeds. Nageswara Rao murders Vajram and accuses Ravi, but he flees. Once Father Joseph recognizes Shantamma and reveals Rajendra as her son. Parallelly, Rani also goes into the ploy of Nageswara Rao when Ravi protects her and knockouts Nageswara Rao. Now Ravi is apprehended, in court, Rajendra is in a judge position when Shantamma learns Ravi is also her own and requests Rajendra to leave his brother. But he stands for justice and sentences Ravi. Finally, Ravi appreciates his brother's honesty and moves to jail leaving their mother's responsibility to Rajendra.

Cast
N. T. Rama Rao as Ravi
Sowcar Janaki as Rani
Jaggayya as Rajendra 
Relangi as Uppalanaiadu
R. Nageswara Rao as Inspector
Mikkilineni as Purushothama Rao
Mukkamala as Nageswara Rao
Chadalavada as Brahmandam
Padmanabham as Cook
K. V. S. Sarma as Father Joseph
A. V. Subba Rao as Madhava Rao
Rajasulochana as Vajram
Girija as Padma 
Malathi as Shantamma
Ch. Prabhavathi as Kamakshi
Kamala as Chenchulakshmi
Nalla Ramamurthy

Soundtrack

Music composed by G. Ashwatthama. Music released on Audio Company.

References

1950s Telugu-language films